Sykes (est. 2001 - June 2019) was a dog actor from Clifton, Oxfordshire, England. He was best known in the UK for his appearance as Harvey in Thinkbox's television commercial and, under his real name, in Midsomer Murders (Series fourteen to eighteen, inclusive). He also appeared in several Hollywood blockbusters, as well as a UK TV movie, several series, and a miniseries.  Originally found as a stray, he was owned by animal trainer and stunt dog specialist Gill Raddings. Since January 2016 Sykes had been in semi-retirement with him no longer being displayed as available for hire on Gill Raddings' agency website.  In September 2016, Midsomer Murders announced that Sykes had retired.  He died in June 2019.

History
Sykes was found roaming as a stray. He was rehomed with Gill Raddings, a stunt dog specialist in Clifton, Oxfordshire.

Career

Sykes went on to become a star of the big and small screen, and considered "one of the most beloved TV dogs since Lassie."  With an article titled, "He irons, he cooks, he acts - Sykes, the thespian terrier," he graced the cover of the Country Life magazine, dated January 25, 2012.  Another article about Sykes and his film career was in The Sunday Times,  in February 2012, titled, "Bites, camera, action".

Motion Pictures 
He appeared in many motion pictures, several of which were Hollywood blockbusters.  Films that Sykes appeared in include Pirates of the Caribbean: The Curse of the Black Pearl (2003), Alexander (2004), Sweeney Todd: The Demon Barber of Fleet Street (2007), The Other Boleyn Girl (2008), Young Victoria (2009), The Duchess (2008), Prince of Persia: The Sands of Time (2010), The Wolfman (2010), Burke and Hare (2010), Clash of the Titans (2010, and Snow White and the Huntsman (2012).

Adverts 
He starred in Thinkbox's award-winning advert "Every Home Needs a Harvey", and became better known to the public as his character in the advert, "Harvey". By the end of 2010, the advert had been viewed on YouTube more than a million times, and had over 11,600 followers on Facebook. The advert was named "Advert of the Year" by a poll of ITV viewers for 2010. Sykes was Dog Trust's Canine Celebrity of the Year.

In September 2010, the John Smith's Brewery advert "Dog Show" began to broadcast, starring Peter Kay and co-starring Sykes as the Jack Russell Terrier.   Campaignlive named the ad as one of the Top Ten Best Dog Ads.

Sykes starred in two more Thinkbox adverts. In 2012, he was with his best friend Rabbit. ' Harvey & Rabbit' appeared in Nielsen's study of the Most Liked Ads of 2012 and Campaign's Top 10 TV & Cinema Ads of 2012. In 2014, Harvey was with his leading lady, Harmony.  ‘Harvey & Harmony’ was one of the nation's top ten most liked ads of 2015, according to a study by Ebiquity and TNS.

In 2016, K-9 magazine considered Sykes as one of the top 5 dogs in television advertising.

Television 
Sykes' TV repertoire was as extensive as his movie appearances.  In 2004, he starred in the children's TV series, In2Minds, as Zoe's pet dog, Sirius. In 2005, Sykes was the dog in the baking commercial in the 4th episode of Series 1 of Doctor Who.  He appeared in the British medical series, Casualty, and Dalziel & Pascoe (possibly Series 9), Heartbeat, and Holby City.  In 2006, Sykes starred in the TV movie, Pickles:  The Dog Who Won the World Cup.  In 2007, Sykes appeared on Miss Marple, Series 3, Episode 3, as Donald, a disobedient dog running on the beach and smelling like fish.  He even sat on Miss Marple's (Geraldine McEwan)  lap. In Return to Cranford (December 2009), he played the part of William Buxton's (Tom Hiddleston) dog named Napoleon.  In episode 1, he was very disobedient, but in episode 2, he was well-behaved.  He also appeared in Doc Martin (2009), Series 4, Episode 1, as the lead dog of strays interested in the cow hearts the Doc (Martin Clunes) was carrying in a grocery bag.   In New Tricks (2011), Series 8, Episode 2, Sykes was a homeless dog owned by a homeless young lady named Leah.

Sykes was then cast in Midsomer Murders after attracting the attention of series producer, Brian True-May, and appeared in every episode of the show's series 14 through 18 (inclusive). He was DCI John Barnaby's (Neil Dudgeon) family dog. On several occasions, DCI Barnaby called his pet dog "Sykesie" instead of Sykes.  Sykes appeared on the List of Midsomer Murders' supporting characters.

Agility competitions and other activities 
During his pre-retirement years, Sykes attended fan conventions, and bank openings.  He competed at Crufts at the championship level, in agility, under the name of "Sykes of the Manor" with his handler, Alison Pearce. In 2013, Sykes competed in the Discover Dogs Small Mixi Pairs alongside Fuzzy No Angel.  In 2014, he was part of the Medium Novice ABC Team, Souldern Medley.

Retirement 
During the filming of Midsomer Murders''' series 18 (2015), Sykes' trainer, Gill Raddings, called the Executive producer and said it was time to retire Sykes at the end of the year.  She had noticed that he had started to go deaf.  Sykes appeared for the last time in episode 6 of Series 18, "Harvest of Souls."   In episode 1 of Series 19 (2016), "The Village That Rose from the Dead," Sykes had passed, and a grave bearing a cross with his name was in the Barnaby backyard.  Betty's pink bear was on top of Syke's grave.  In episode 3 of Series 19 (2016), "Last Man Out," DI Ben Jones expressed his condolences to the Barnaby family for the loss of Sykes.

In January 2016, Sykes was in semi-retirement as the Gill Raddings Stunt Dogs website indicated that Sykes was no longer available for hire, but could be made available for producers he had previously worked for. On September 22, 2016, Midsomer Murders officially announced that Sykes, a veteran of the big and small screen, had retired.

The official Harvey Facebook page showed that in September 2016, Harvey, Harmony, Rabbit, and the pups were relaxing. In December 2016, Sykes was running through the grounds of the Bicester Hotel Golf and Spa with a miniature replica of an Oscar in his mouth. Gill Raddings, his trainer, said that Sykes has never been happier. "He is loving life....He's been going for nice long walks every day and is sleeping a bit more on the sofa nowadays. Sykes has had a long working life, plus he's going a bit deaf now, so it was time for him to retire... He still gets recognized a lot, and people come up to him for selfies... He is a very happy chap and has earned every minute of his retirement." Sykes spent his retirement years with his foster family, initially one of two dogs, but over time became of one of six.

 Awards/Recognition 

 Death 
On June 19, 2019, the official Midsomer Murders Facebook page reported that Sykes had died. Midsomer Murders co-producer Ian Strachan began the Facebook tribute by saying, "The best dog on the telly. Sad news that Midsomer's retired sidekick Sykes, loyal companion to John Barnaby and family passed away over the weekend." His foster mom, Alison Pearce made a Facebook comment to the Midsomer Murders''' tribute: "Forever in our hearts, cheeky boy.  A pleasure to foster you for 16 years."  She also clarified that he was actually 18 years of age when he died.

Remembrance 
Sykes was remembered as one of the "great pets that we have had the pleasure to cross paths with over the years on various British dramas and mysteries" in the article of February 20, 2021, "Remembering Midsomer Murders' Sykes and other 4-legged Screen Pets on National Love Your Pet Day 2021!"

On August 26, 2021, International Dog Day, Sykes was the main topic of the article, "Remembering Midsomer Murders' Sykes and other 4-legged screen pets on International Dog Day 2021!"

Filmography

Films

Adverts

Television

See also
 List of individual dogs

References

External links
 Gill Radding's Stunt Dogs and Animals
 Official Harvey Facebook Page
 

Dog actors
2019 animal deaths